Jérémy Lelièvre (born 8 February 1991 in Évreux) is a French athlete competing in combined events. He represented his country in the heptathlon at the 2016 World Indoor Championships finishing eighth.

Competition record

Personal bests
Outdoor
100 metres – 10.83 (+1.6 m/s, Nice 2014)
400 metres – 47.83 (Tallinn 2013)
1000 metres – 2:37.64 (Maromme 2012)
1500 metres – 4:21.80 (Tallinn 2017)
110 metres hurdles – 14.48 (-0.8 m/s, Toruń 2014)
High jump – 1.93 (Arles 2013)
Pole vault – 4.70 (Antony 2012)
Long jump – 7.54 (+1.2 m/s, Marseille 2017)
Shot put – 15.21 (Gwangju 2015) 
Discus throw – 44.37 (Tallinn 2013)
Javelin throw – 59.69 (Lillebonne 2013)
Decathlon – 7911 (Aubagne 2012)
Indoor
60 metres – 6.84 (Gothenburg 2013)
1000 metres – 2:35.89 (Aubière 2013)
60 metres hurdles – 8.14 (Reims 2016)
High jump – 1.97 (Aubière 2013)
Pole vault – 4.65 (Aubière 2016)
Long jump – 7.36 (Aubière 2013)
Shot put – 15.37 (Aubière 2015)
Heptathlon – 5997 (Aubière 2013)

References

1991 births
Living people
Sportspeople from Évreux
French decathletes
21st-century French people